Keispelt is a small town in the commune of Kehlen, in central Luxembourg. , the town has a population of 555.

Kehlen
Towns in Luxembourg